Seven Year Itch: Greatest Hits, 1994–2001 (stylized as 7even Year Itch) is the first greatest hits album by Collective Soul, released on September 18, 2001. The compilation includes songs recorded from 1994 to 2001 and included two new tracks, "Next Homecoming" and "Energy". Seven Year Itch received decent reviews and was relatively successful. It sold 225,000 copies in the first year after its release and reached number 50 on the Billboard 200; in Canada, it reached number nine on its albums chart and went platinum.
 
The compilation has sold over 500,000 copies. It saw a resurgence in sales after Collective Soul began putting out albums on their own independent label, El Music Group, beginning in 2004.

Seven Year Itch was the last album Collective Soul released through Atlantic Records and their last album to feature guitarist Ross Childress, who had been with the band since its 1993/1994 debut.

Track listing
All tracks written by Ed Roland, except where indicated.
"Heavy"  – 2:55
Originally from Dosage
"She Said"  – 4:14
Originally from Dosage
Written as 4:51 in CD Case; in reference to the version from the soundtrack to the film Scream 2.
"Shine"  – 5:06
Originally from Hints, Allegations, and Things Left Unsaid
"Energy"  – 3:19
Previously unreleased
"Run"  – 4:33
Originally from Dosage
"Gel"  – 2:58
Originally from Collective Soul
"Precious Declaration"  – 3:41
Originally from Disciplined Breakdown
"Why, Pt. 2"  – 3:37
Originally from Blender
"The World I Know" (Roland, Ross Childress)  – 4:15
Originally from Collective Soul
"Next Homecoming"  – 3:11
Previously unreleased
"Listen"  – 4:12
Originally from Disciplined Breakdown
"December"  – 4:43
Originally from Collective Soul
"Forgiveness"  – 5:00
Originally from Disciplined Breakdown

Track notes
"She Said" was previously released as a hidden track on Dosage, where it was merged on the same track as the album's listed closer "Crown". A different mix of "She Said" was first released on the Scream 2 soundtrack.
Some releases have "Perfect Day" featuring Elton John, originally from Blender as track 7 following "Gel", moving "Precious Declaration" onwards down one place.

Personnel
Ed Roland – vocals, keyboards, guitars
Ross Childress – lead and rhythm guitars
Dean Roland – rhythm guitars
Will Turpin – bass, percussion
Shane Evans – drums, percussion

Charts

Weekly charts

Year-end charts

References 

2001 greatest hits albums
Collective Soul albums
Albums produced by Ed Roland
Atlantic Records compilation albums